Shamsul Hoque was an Indian Bengali politician. He was the inaugural holder of the Mahendraganj constituency at the Meghalaya Legislative Assembly.

Life
Hoque was born into a Bengali Muslim family in the village of Majherchar in the Garo Hills of Meghalaya. Despite being an independent candidate, he defeated Khelaram Barman of the Indian National Congress at the state's first ever elections, thus winning a seat at the Mahendraganj constituency of South West Garo Hills district. Among Hoque's contribution was the demand for the electrification of Mahendraganj. On 14 July 1974, the Border Security Force committed atrocities in Majherchar and surrounding villages. Hoque attempted to protect his constituents but was kidnapped by the Border Security Force and locked up in their nearby checkpoint. Local police managed to free Hoque the next day.

He also participated in the 1978 and 1983 Meghalaya Legislative Assembly elections but only reached second place in both elections.

References

Meghalaya politicians
Meghalaya MLAs 1972–1978
Year of birth missing
20th-century Bengalis
People from South West Garo Hills district
20th-century Indian Muslims
Indian Sunni Muslims